The High Commission of Sri Lanka ( Shri Lanka Maha Komasaris Karyalaya Landanaya) in London is the diplomatic mission of Sri Lanka in the United Kingdom. There has been a Sri Lankan High Commission in London since 1948, which was called the High Commission of Ceylon until 1972.

Gallery

See also
Sri Lankan High Commissioner to the United Kingdom

References

External links
 Official site

Sri Lanka
Diplomatic missions of Sri Lanka
Sri Lanka–United Kingdom relations
Buildings and structures in the City of Westminster
Bayswater